Maulvi Tamizuddin Khan (M. T. Khan; March 1889 – 19 August 1963) was the Speaker of Pakistan's Constituent Assembly from 1948 to 1954 and National Assembly of Pakistan between 1962 and 1963.

Early life
Khan was born to a farmer with only three acres of land. He completed his master's in English from presidency college in 1913 and LLB in 1915 from Rippon college and started his legal profession in Faridpur. making him the first Muslim from Faridpur district to complete master's degree.

Career
Khan joined non-cooperation movement led by Gandhi when he was a student. Later he joined the Indian National Congress and subsequently joined khilafat movement in 1921 and was arrested and sent to Faridpur jail and later was shifted to Central jail in Dhaka. At that time, he was an ardent follower of Chittaranjan Das. 

Khan was elected vice-chairman of Faridpur Municipality. In 1926, he got elected to the Bengal Legislative Assembly from Faridpur. Khan left Congress in 1926 as he thought that the party was biased towards the Hindus He later became the secretary of the Anjuman-i-Islamia and subsequently joined the Muslim League.

He competed on a Muslim League ticket in the 1937 election and defeated the Congressional candidate convincingly. Between 1937 and 1947, Khan served twice as Minister of Health, Agriculture, Industry and Education in Bengal.

Khan created history when the Constituent Assembly was dismissed by Governor General Ghulam Mohammad in 1954. Khan challenged the dismissal in the court and the case was filed in the morning of 7 November 1954, by Advocate Manzar-e-Alam. Although the High Court agreed and overturned it, the Federal Court under Justice Muhammad Munir upheld the dismissal. He had been president of the Basic Principles Committee set up in 1949.

"Justice A. R. Cornelius was the sole dissenting judge in the landmark judgment handed down by the Supreme Court in the Maulvi Tamizuddin case. That judgment altered the course of politics in Pakistan forever and sealed the fate of democracy. The law had guided him as he had interpreted it and his conscience.".

The decision to uphold the dismissal of the constituent assembly was to mark the beginning of the overt role of Pakistan's military and civil establishment in Pakistani politics.

Personal life
Khan's daughters were Razia Khan and Qulsum Huda Khan. Razia was an Ekushey Padak winning writer and poet, and married to Anwarul Amin Makhon, the youngest son of former Prime Minister of Pakistan Nurul Amin. They have a son named Kaiser Tamiz Amin and a daughter named Aasha Mehreen Amin. On the other hand, Qulsum was one of the founders and vice-chancellors of Central Women's University.

References 

1889 births
1963 deaths
People from Faridpur District
Surendranath College alumni
University of Calcutta alumni
Bengali politicians
Krishak Sramik Party politicians
Speakers of the National Assembly of Pakistan
Pakistani MNAs 1947–1954
Bengal MLAs 1937–1945
Members of the Constituent Assembly of Pakistan